The neuraxis or sometimes neuroaxis is the axis of the central nervous system. It denotes the direction in which the central nervous system lies. During embryological development, the neuraxis is bent by various flexures, contributing to the mature structure of the brain and spinal cord.

Embryonic development can help in understanding the structure of the adult brain because it establishes a framework on which more complex structures can be built. First, the neural tube establishes the anterior–posterior dimension of the nervous system, which is called the neuraxis. The embryonic nervous system in mammals can be said to have a standard arrangement. Humans (and other primates, to some degree) make this complicated by standing up and walking on two legs.
The anterior–posterior dimension of the neuraxis overlays the superior–inferior dimension of the body. However, there is a major curve between the brain stem and forebrain, which is called the cephalic flexure. Because of this, the neuraxis starts in an inferior position—the end of the spinal cord—and ends in an anterior position, the front of the cerebrum. This may be confusing and can be illustrated when looking at a four-legged animal standing up on two legs. Without the flexure in the brain stem, and at the top of the neck, that animal would be looking straight up instead of straight in front.

Additional images

See also
Embryology
Neural tube
Pontine flexure
Rostrum (anatomy)

References

This article incorporates text from the Creative Commons Attribution 3.0 Licensed edition of Anatomy & Physiology by OpenStax College

Neuroanatomy